Year 1185 (MCLXXXV) was a common year starting on Tuesday (link will display the full calendar) of the Julian calendar.

Events 
 By place 

 Byzantine Empire 
 August – King William II (the Good) lands in Epirus with a Siculo-Norman expeditionary force of 200 ships and 80,000 men (including 5,000 knights), and marches as far as the Byzantine city of Thessalonica, which he takes and pillages (massacring some 7,000 Greek citizens).
 September 11–12 – Isaac II (Angelos) leads a revolt in Constantinople and deposes Emperor Andronikos I (Komnenos). Andronikos tries in vain to flee across Asia – but he is captured and killed by an angry mob. Isaac is proclaimed emperor, ending the Komnenos Dynasty.
 November 7 – Battle of Demetritzes: A reinforced Byzantine army under Alexios Branas decisively defeats William II – ending his invasion of the Byzantine Empire. Thessalonica is recaptured, and the Normans are pushed back to Italy. Many Norman ships are lost to storms.
 Peter and John Asen lead a revolt of the Vlachs and Bulgars against the Byzantine Empire, eventually establishing the Second Bulgarian Empire.

 Levant 
 March 16  – The 23-year-old King Baldwin IV (the Leper) dies of leprosy after a 10-year reign. He is succeeded by his 8-year-old nephew, Baldwin V, as the sole ruler of Jerusalem under the regency of Count Raymond of Tripoli. The child-king becomes a pawn in the politics of the kingdom, between his mother Sibylla of Jerusalem (sister of Baldwin IV) and her younger half-sister Isabella I. 
 Saladin agrees to a 4-year truce due to severe drought and famine, which has struck Palestine. The treaty is signed by Count Raymond of Tripoli and important nobles from Jerusalem. Commerce is renewed between the Crusader States and their Muslim neighbors. A flow of corn from the east saves the Crusaders and the population from starvation.

 England 
 April – King Henry II knights his son and heir, the 18-year-old John of England and sends him to Ireland, accompanied by 300 knights and a team of administrators, to enforce English control. He treats the local Irish rulers with contempt, by making fun of their unfashionable long beards. Failing to make allies amongst the Anglo-Norman settlers, the English army is unable to subdue the Irish fighters in unfamiliar conditions and the expedition soon becomes a complete disaster. By the end of the year, John returns to England in defeat. Nonetheless, Henry gets him named 'King of Ireland' by Pope Urban III and procures a golden crown with peacock feathers.
 April 15 – 1185 East Midlands earthquake occurs. It is the first earthquake in England for which there are reliable reports indicating the damage.

 Europe 
 July – Treaty of Boves: King Philip II signed a treaty to ensure his authority over his vassals, with Amiénois, Artois, and other places in northern France passing to him. Philip is given the nickname "Augustus" by the monk Rigord for augmenting French lands.
 August 15 – The cave monastery of Vardzia is consecrated by Queen Tamar the Great. She marries Yury Bogolyubsky, Grand Prince of Novgorod.
 September – Henry III (the Lion), duke of Saxony, returns to Germany after being banished for three years by Emperor Frederick I (Barbarossa).
 December 6 – King Afonso I (the Great) dies after a 36-year reign. He is succeeded by his son Sancho I (the Populator) as ruler of Portugal.
 Igor Svyatoslavich's failed campaign against the Cumans, later immortalized in The Tale of Igor's Campaign, takes place this year.

 Africa 
 The Almohad forces under Caliph Abu Yusuf Yaqub al-Mansur reconquer Béjaïa and Algiers, that has been taken by the Banu Ghaniya, descendants of the Almoravids.

 Asia 
 March 22 – Battle of Yashima: Japanese forces (some 30,000 horses) under Minamoto no Yoshitsune defeat the Taira clan just off Shikoku in the Seto Inland Sea. 
 April 25 – Battle of Dan-no-Ura: The Japanese fleet (some 300 ships) led by Minamoto no Yoshitsune defeats the fleet of the Taira clan in the Shimonoseki Strait.
 December – Retired-Emperor Go-Shirakawa grants Minamoto no Yoritomo the authority to form the first bakufu (shogunate) in Japan, ending the Genpei War.

 By topic 

 Astronomy 
 May 1 – The Solar eclipse of 1 May 1185, visible across Central America, Northern, and Eastern Europe, and Kazakhstan, occurs.

 Markets 
 Evidence is first uncovered, that Henry II is using the safes of the Temple Church in London, under the guard of the Knights Templar, to store part of his treasure.

 Religion 
 November 25 – Pope Lucius III dies after a 4-year pontificate at Verona. He is succeeded by Urban III as the 172nd pope of the Catholic Church (until 1187).

Births 
 April 23 – Afonso II (the Fat), king of Portugal (d. 1223)
 Alexander of Hales, English philosopher (d. 1245)
 Angelus of Jerusalem, Israeli priest and martyr (d. 1220)
 Dietrich V, German nobleman (approximate date)
 Engelbert II, archbishop of Cologne (approximate date)
 Fujiwara no Reishi, Japanese empress (d. 1243)
 Gerard III, count of Guelders and Zutphen (d. 1229)
 Gertrude of Merania, queen of Hungary  (d. 1213)
 Inge II (Bårdsson), king of Norway (d. 1217)
 Michael of Chernigov, Kievan Grand Prince (d. 1246)
 Patrick II, Anglo-Scottish nobleman (d. 1249)
 Raymond Roger, French nobleman (d. 1209)
 Robert III, count of Dreux and Braine (d. 1234)
 Shams Tabrizi, Persian poet and writer (d. 1248)
 Tancred of Siena, Italian missionary (d. 1241)

Deaths 
 February 9 – Theodoric I, margrave of Lusatia (b. 1130)
 March 16 – Baldwin IV (the Leper), king of Jerusalem (b. 1161)
 March 22 – Satō Tsugunobu, Japanese warrior (b. 1158)
 April 25 – Battle of Dan-no-Ura:
 Antoku, child-emperor of Japan (b. 1178)
 Taira no Tokiko, Japanese Buddhist nun (b. 1126)
 Taira no Norimori, Japanese nobleman (b. 1128)
 Taira no Noritsune, Japanese nobleman (b. 1160)
 Taira no Tomomori, Japanese nobleman (b. 1152)
 Taira no Tsunemori, Japanese nobleman (b. 1124)
 June 16 – Richeza of Poland, queen of Castile (b. 1140)
 May 30 – Constantine Makrodoukas, Byzantine nobleman
 June 19 – Taira no Munemori, Japanese samurai (b. 1147)
 July 18 – Stefan, archbishop of Uppsala (b. before 1143)
 September 11 – Stephen Hagiochristophorites, Byzantine official
 September 12 
 Andronikos I (Komnenos), Byzantine emperor (b. 1118)
 John Komnenos, Byzantine co-emperor (b. 1159)
 November 25 – Lucius III, pope of the Catholic Church (b. 1097)
 December 6 – Afonso I (the Great), king of Portugal (b. 1109)
 Abd Allah al-Suhayli, Moorish scholar and writer (b. 1114)
 Bhāskara (the Teacher), Indian mathematician (b. 1114)
 Fernando Rodríguez de Castro, Spanish nobleman (b. 1125)
 Ibn Tufail, Arab-Andalusian polymath and writer (b. 1105)
 Máel Íosa Ua Dálaigh, Irish Chief Ollam and writer
 Taira no Shigehira, Japanese general (b. 1158)

References